Since the development of the university sector in Hong Kong (The University of Hong Kong 1887) a small number of Vice-Chancellors (President, Director) have served for 15 years or more. They include:

16 years: Poon Chung-kwong GBS OBE(Hong Kong Polytechnic 1991-2008);

15 years: Sir Lindsay Ride CBE (Hong Kong 1949-64), Li Choh-ming KBE (Chinese University of Hong Kong 1963-78), Henry Hu (Hong Kong Shue Yan 2007-ff), Way Kuo (City 2008-23).

All publicly funded universities (i.e. funded by the University Grants Committee) in Hong Kong has the Chief Executive as the chancellor (*). The Chief Executive is also the president of The Hong Kong Academy for Performing Arts and chancellor of The Open University of Hong Kong.

The current list of vice-chancellors and presidents of universities and degree-awarding tertiary institutions in Hong Kong is:
 President of the City University of Hong Kong (Kuo Way, JP)
 President and Vice-Chancellor of the Hong Kong Baptist University (Roland T Chin, BBS, JP)
 President of the Lingnan University (Leonard Cheng, BBS, JP)
 Vice-Chancellor/President of the Chinese University of Hong Kong (Rocky Tuan, SBS, JP)
 President of the Hong Kong Polytechnic University (Timothy W Tong, JP)
 President of the Hong Kong University of Science and Technology (Tony F Chan, JP)
 Vice-Chancellor and President the University of Hong Kong (Xiang Zhang)
 President of the Open University of Hong Kong (Wong Yuk-shan, BBS, JP)
 President of the Hong Kong Shue Yan University (Henry Hu)
 President of the Chu Hai College of Higher Education (Chen Zhi)
 President of The Hong Kong Institute of Education * (Anthony Cheung, GBS, JP)
 President of the Caritas Francis Hsu College (Dr Kim Mak)
 Director of The Hong Kong Academy of Performing Arts (Adrian Walter)

See also 
 List of Vice-Chancellors of the University of Hong Kong
 List of Presidents and Vice-Chancellors of the Chinese University of Hong Kong

 
University vice-chancellors and presidents
Hong Kong